The Expedition Cross officially known as the Cross for Important Military Operations was a military decoration of Kingdom of the Netherlands. Created by royal decree on 19 February 1869, by King William III, the cross was awarded for participation in major military operations between 1846 and 1942.

Description
The Expedition Cross is a four-armed silver metal cross,  in diameter. The obverse bears the effigy of King William III in a round center medallion, surrounded by a garter with the inscription VOOR KRIJGSVERRIGTINGEN (for military operations). Between the arms of the cross is a wreath of oak leaves. On each of the four the arms is a "W" monogram. The reverse is plain.

The ribbon is light green with yellow-orange borders.

Clasps

Campaign clasps are also silver and are 42 mm by 9 mm, they are worn on the ribbon of the medal. When the cross was established there were six clasps, in subsequent years the total number of clasps rose to 33.

Bali 1846
Bali 1848
Bali 1849
Borneo 1850–1854
Boni 1859
Borneo 1859–1863
Guinea 1869–1870
Deli 1872
Atjeh 1873–1874
Atjeh 1873–1876
Samalangan 1877
Atjeh 1873–1880
Atjeh 1873–1885
Atjeh 1873–1890
Tamiang 1893
Atjeh 1873–1896
Atjeh 1896–1900
Korintji 1903
Djambi 1901–1904
Gajo en Alaslanden 1904
Atjeh 1901–1905
Midden-Sumatra 1903–1907
Zuid-Celebes 1905–1908
Flores 1907–1908
Kleine Soenda-eilanden 1905–1909
Atjeh 1906–1910
Nieuw-Guinea 1907–1915
Atjeh 1911–1914
W.Afd. Borneo 1912–1914
N. Guinea 1907–1915
Ceram 1915
W-Kust Atjeh 1925-1927
Timor 1942

References

Expedition Cross
Military awards and decorations of the Royal Netherlands East Indies Army